The Bayou Teche Byway is a Louisiana Scenic Byway that follows several different state highways, primarily:
LA 31 and LA 182 along the west bank of Bayou Teche from Morgan City to Arnaudville;
LA 86 and LA 87 along the east bank of the bayou from Charenton to New Iberia;
LA 96 and LA 352 in a loop off of the bayou from St. Martinville to Henderson via Catahoula; and
LA 347 along the east bank of the bayou from Breaux Bridge to Arnaudville.

References

Louisiana Scenic Byways
Tourist attractions in Iberia Parish, Louisiana
Tourist attractions in St. Landry Parish, Louisiana
Tourist attractions in St. Martin Parish, Louisiana
Tourist attractions in St. Mary Parish, Louisiana
Scenic highways in Louisiana